The Divine Comedy is an epic poem by Dante Alighieri.

Divine Comedy or The Divine Comedy may also refer to:
 Divine Comedy, a closet screenplay written by Haruhiko Arai, based on Onishi's novel 
 Divine Comedy, a novel written by Kyojin Onishi
 The Divine Comedy (band), a band from Northern Ireland
 The Divine Comedy (film), a 1991 Portuguese drama film directed by Manoel de Oliveira
 The Divine Comedy (Milla Jovovich album), an album by Milla Jovovich
 The Divine Comedy (Smith), a symphony for concert band by Robert W. Smith
 The Divine Comedy (Ai Weiwei album), an album by Al Weiwei